is a Japanese footballer who played for Blancdieu Hirosaki.

Career
On 12 January 2021, Funakawa announcement officially transfer to Hokushinetsu Football League club, Blancdieu Hirosaki for ahead of 2021 season.

Personal life
Funakawa plays for Kochi United SC of the Shikoku Soccer League from 2018 until 2020.

Career statistics

Club
Updated to the start from 2023 season.

References

External links

Profile at Blaublitz Akita

1996 births
Living people
Association football people from Akita Prefecture
Japanese footballers
J3 League players
Japan Football League players
Blaublitz Akita players
Artista Asama players
Kochi United SC players
Association football forwards